Grazina may refer to:

Gražina name, a Lithuanian feminine given name
Grazina Frame, (born 1941) English singer and actress

See also 
 Grażyna, a Polish feminine given name